Queen of the Angels is an oil painting by the French artist William-Adolphe Bouguereau. Its dimensions are 285 × 185 cm.

It is exhibited at the Petit Palais.

References

 

1900 paintings
Paintings by William-Adolphe Bouguereau
Paintings in the collection of the Petit Palais
Paintings of the Madonna and Child
Angels in art
Religious paintings